Borambola is a  rural community in the central east part of the Riverina.  It is situated on the Sturt Highway about 16 kilometres east of Alfredtown and 30 kilometres east of Wagga Wagga.  At the 2006 census, Borambola had a population of 129 people.

The Borambola area is home to the Borambola Sport and Recreation Centre that caters for conference and facility hire, as well as family, vacation, school camps and reunion camps.  Borambola Sport and Recreation Centre is managed by NSW Sport and Recreation.

Notes and references

Towns in the Riverina
Towns in New South Wales